Oktyabr is a rural locality (a village) in Isheyevsky Selsoviet, Ishimbaysky District, Bashkortostan, Russia. The population was 91 as of 2010. There are 4 streets.

Geography 
Oktyabr is located 26 km north of Ishimbay (the district's administrative centre) by road. Shakhtau is the nearest rural locality.

References 

Rural localities in Ishimbaysky District